The 2006 Giro della Toscana Int. Femminile – Memorial Michela Fanini was the 13th edition of the Giro della Toscana Int. Femminile – Memorial Michela Fanini, a women's cycling stage race in Italy. It was rated by the UCI as category 2.1 race, and was held between 12 and 17 September 2006.

Stages

Stage 1
12 September 2006 – Viareggio to Viareggio, Team time trial

Stage 2a
13 September 2006 – Porcari to Montecarlo,

Stage 2b
13 September 2006 – Altopascio to Altopascio,

Stage 3
14 September 2006 – Lari to Volterra,

Stage 4a
15 September 2006 – Castelfranco Di Sotto to Castelfranco Di Sotto,

Stage 4b
15 September 2006 – Campi Bisenzio to Campi Bisenzio,

Stage 5
16 September 2006 – Segromigno in Piano to Capannori,

Stage 6
17 September 2006 – Quarrata to Firenze,

Final classification

Source

See also
 2006 in women's road cycling

References

External links
 

2006 in women's road cycling
Giro della Toscana Int. Femminile – Memorial Michela Fanini
2006 in Italian sport